Neil Blender (born 1963) is an American former professional skateboarder, skate company owner, and artist. His pro career began during his senior year of high school in 1981. He is regular-footed. By age 1986, Blender invented at least two tricks, the Wooly Mammoth and the Gay Twist.

Skateboarding

Early life 
Blender skated for Powerflex for three years in his mid-teens. Brad Jackman introduced Blender to Gail Webb, team manager of Powerflex who signed Neil. After Powerflex went out of business, Blender skated a contest at the Big 'O' Skatepark in Orange, placing first. Steve Cathey from the G&S amateur skateboarding team appreciated Blender's skating and signed him to G&S.

In January 1981, Blender appeared on national television on the 'World of People' television program, which featured footage from a skate contest in San Francisco.

Professional career 
In 1990 Chris Carter, Mike Hill, and Blender decided to form Alien Workshop, a company based in Dayton, Ohio, United States (U.S.), at a time when the skateboard industry's core was located in California.

Throughout his career, Blender often made cameos in other companies skate videos. In 2015, Blender was inducted into the Skateboarding Hall of Fame.

In the 30th Anniversary edition of Transworld Skateboarding, published on December 20, 2011, Blender was number 19 of the 30 most influential skaters of all time.

Skate video appearances 
 1985 - Summer Sessions - Sure-Grip International
1985-87 - NSA contest videos: Del Mar, Houston, Chicago
1988 - The Vision Pro Skate Escape
1988 - Thrasher - Savannah Slamma
1988 - Ohio Skateout
1989 - Santa Cruz - Speed Freaks
1989 - Goin' Off!
1990 - Gordon & Smith- Footage
 2004 - Destroy Everything Now - 88 Footwear

Art 
In his teenage years, Blender enjoyed drawing cartoons and photography. Blender was one of the first skaters to design his own board graphics.

References

External links 

 Classic Neil Blender board art - Thrasher Magazine
 Collection of photos of Neil Blender

American skateboarders
Artist skateboarders
1963 births
Living people